Maurício Agostinho Camuto, C.S.Sp. (born 26 December 1963) is an Angolan bishop of the Catholic Church and a member of the Spiritans. He is the bishop of the Diocese of Caxito, having been appointed to the position in 2020. He previously served as the director of Radio Ecclesia, a Catholic commercial radio station in Angola.

Early life
Camuto was born in Colungo Alto, in the province of Cuanza Norte, on 26 December 1963.  He studied theology in Brazzaville, Republic of the Congo, and made his first vows as a Spiritan on 5 September 1987.  On 28 July 1991, Camuto was ordained to the Catholic priesthood.  Subsequently, he undertook studies in social communication at the Salesian Pontifical University in Rome from 2000 until 2003.

Presbyteral ministry
Camuto's first pastoral assignment was to the mission at Landana in the Diocese of Cabinda, where he spent four years.  He became rector of the Spiritan preparatory seminary in the then-Diocese of Malanje in 1995, and held that position until 1999, when he was transferred to the Spiritan Scholasticate in Huambo and Benguela.

Camuto served two stints as the director of Radio Ecclesia, a Catholic commercial radio station in Angola; first from 2006 to 2010, and again from 2016 to the present.  The radio station is known in Angola as "the voice of the voiceless".  It has received criticism for shedding light on human rights abuses in the country and uncovering mismanagement of public resources.  In spite of a lack of material supplies and a "huge shortage of sources of information", Camuto was able to ensure that the radio station continued to be independent.  This resulted in "tangible changes to government accountability".

Camuto was the provincial superior of the Spiritan Fathers in Angola, serving two terms from 2010 to 2016.

Episcopal ministry
Camuto was appointed Bishop of Caxito on 15 June 2020.

References

1963 births
20th-century Roman Catholic priests

21st-century Roman Catholic priests
Holy Ghost Fathers
Living people
People from Cuanza Norte Province
Roman Catholic bishops of Caxito